NTI may refer to:

People
 Nti (surname)

Miscellanea

 Network Telephone Interface, alternative term for the network interface device
 NTi Audio, company
 National Telecommuting Institute, non-profit organization dedicated to work-at-home opportunities for primarily the disabled
 New Technology Institute, training venue in the Eastside of Birmingham, England
 Nociceptive trigeminal inhibition tension suppression system, dental mouthguard
 Northwest Territorial Imperative, North American separatist movement
 Nuclear Threat Initiative, non-profit organization working to prevent catastrophic attacks and accidents with weapons of mass destruction
 Nunavut Tunngavik Incorporated, legal representative of the Inuit of Nunavut 
 Vector NTI, software package
 NTI, the IATA code for Steenkool Airport, Indonesia